In mathematics and theoretical computer science, a constant-recursive sequence is an infinite sequence of numbers where each number in the sequence is equal to a fixed linear combination of one or more of its immediate predecessors. A constant-recursive sequence is also known as a linear recurrence sequence, linear-recursive sequence, linear-recurrent sequence, a C-finite sequence, or a solution to a linear recurrence with constant coefficients.

The most famous example of a constant-recursive sequence is the Fibonacci sequence , in which each number is the sum of the previous two. The power of two sequence  is also constant-recursive because each number is the sum of twice the previous number. The square number sequence  is also constant-recursive. However, not all sequences are constant-recursive; for example, the factorial sequence  is not constant-recursive. All arithmetic progressions, all geometric progressions, and all polynomials are constant-recursive.

Formally, a sequence of numbers  is constant-recursive if it satisfies a recurrence relation

where  are constants. For example, the Fibonacci sequence satisfies the recurrence relation  where  is the th Fibonacci number.

Constant-recursive sequences are studied in combinatorics and the theory of finite differences. They also arise in algebraic number theory, due to the relation of the sequence to the roots of a polynomial; in the analysis of algorithms as the running time of simple recursive functions; and in formal language theory, where they count strings up to a given length in a regular language. Constant-recursive sequences are closed under important mathematical operations such as term-wise addition, term-wise multiplication, and Cauchy product.

The Skolem–Mahler–Lech theorem states that the zeros of a constant-recursive sequence have a regularly repeating (eventually periodic) form. On the other hand, the Skolem problem, which asks for an algorithm to determine whether a linear recurrence has at least one zero, is a famous unsolved problem in mathematics.

Definition

for all  where  are constants.
(This equation is called a linear recurrence with constant coefficients of order d.)

The d coefficients  must be coefficients ranging over the same domain as the sequence (integers, rational numbers, algebraic numbers, real numbers, or complex numbers). For example for a rational constant-recursive sequence,  and  must be rational numbers.

Some authors require that , which excludes such sequences.

Examples

Fibonacci and Lucas sequences
More generally, every Lucas sequence is constant-recursive of order 2.

Arithmetic progressions
For any  and any , the arithmetic progression  is constant-recursive of order 2, because it satisfies . Generalizing this, see polynomial sequences below.

Geometric progressions
This includes, for example, the sequence 1, 2, 4, 8, 16, ... as well as the rational number sequence .

Eventually periodic sequences
A sequence that is eventually periodic with period length  is constant-recursive, since it satisfies  for all , where the order  is the length of the initial segment including the first repeating block. Examples of such sequences are 1, 0, 0, 0, ... (order 1) and 1, 6, 6, 6, ... (order 2).

Polynomial sequences
A sequence defined by a polynomial  is constant-recursive. The sequence satisfies a recurrence of order  (where  is the degree of the polynomial), with coefficients given by the corresponding element of the binomial transform. The first few such equations are

  for a degree 0 (that is, constant) polynomial,
  for a degree 1 or less polynomial,
  for a degree 2 or less polynomial, and
  for a degree 3 or less polynomial.

A sequence obeying the order-d equation also obeys all higher order equations. These identities may be proved in a number of ways, including via the theory of finite differences.
Any sequence of  integer, real, or complex values can be used as initial conditions for a constant-recursive sequence of order . If the initial conditions lie on a polynomial of degree  or less, then the constant-recursive sequence also obeys a lower order equation.

Enumeration of words in a regular language

Then  is constant-recursive. More generally, any function accepted by a weighted automaton over the unary alphabet  over the semiring  (which is in fact a ring, and even a field) is constant-recursive.

Other examples

The sequences of Jacobsthal numbers, Padovan numbers, Pell numbers, and Perrin numbers are constant-recursive.

Non-examples

The factorial sequence  is not constant-recursive. More generally, every constant-recursive function is asymptotically bounded by an exponential function (see #Closed-form characterization) and the factorial sequence grows faster than this.

The Catalan sequence  is not constant-recursive. This is because the generating function of the Catalan numbers is not a rational function (see #Equivalent definitions).

Equivalent definitions

In terms of matrices

|-align=center
|

A sequence  is constant-recursive of order  if and only if it can be written as

In terms of non-homogeneous linear recurrences

|- class="wikitable"
! Non-homogeneous !! Homogeneous
|- align = "center"
| 
| 
|- align = "center"
| 
| 

A non-homogeneous linear recurrence is an equation of the form

where  is an additional constant. Any sequence satisfying a non-homogeneous linear recurrence is constant-recursive.

In terms of generating functions 

|-align=center
|

A sequence is constant-recursive precisely when its generating function

The denominator is the polynomial obtained from the auxiliary polynomial by reversing the order of the coefficients, and the numerator is determined by the initial values of the sequence.

The explicit derivation of the generating function in terms of the linear recurrence is

where

In terms of sequence spaces

|-align=center
|

A sequence  is constant-recursive if and only if the set of sequences

is contained in a sequence space (vector space of sequences) whose dimension is finite. That is,  is contained in a finite-dimensional subspace of  closed under the left-shift operator.

Closed-form characterization 

|-align=center
|

Constant-recursive sequences admit the following unique closed form characterization using exponential polynomials: every constant-recursive sequence can be written in the form

where
  is a sequence which is zero for all  (the order of the sequence);
  are complex polynomials; and
  are distinct complex constants.

This characterization is exact: every sequence of complex numbers that can be written in the above form is constant-recursive.

For example, the Fibonacci number  is written in this form using Binet's formula:

Notice that though the original sequence was over the integers, the closed form solution involves real or complex roots. In general, for sequences of integers or rationals, the closed formula will use algebraic numbers.

The complex numbers  are the roots of the characteristic polynomial (or "auxiliary polynomial") of the recurrence:

whose coefficients are the same as those of the recurrence.
If the  roots  are all distinct, then the polynomials  are all constants, which can be determined from the initial values of the sequence.

The term  is only needed when ; if  then it corrects for the fact that some initial values may be exceptions to the general recurrence. In particular,  for all , the order of the sequence.

Closure properties

Examples

The sum of two constant-recursive sequences is also constant-recursive. The new recurrence can be found by adding the generating functions for each sequence.

Similarly, the product of two constant-recursive sequences is constant-recursive.

The left-shift sequence  and the right-shift sequence  (with ) are constant-recursive because they satisfy the same recurrence relation.

List of operations

The closure under term-wise addition and multiplication follows from the closed-form characterization in terms of exponential polynomials. The closure under Cauchy product follows from the generating function characterization. The requirement  for Cauchy inverse is necessary for the case of integer sequences, but can be replaced by  if the sequence is over any field (rational, algebraic, real, or complex numbers).

Behavior

Zeros
Despite satisfying a simple local formula, a constant-recursive sequence can exhibit complicated global behavior. Define a zero of a constant-recursive sequence to be a nonnegative integer  such that . The Skolem–Mahler–Lech theorem states that the zeros of the sequence are eventually repeating: there exists constants  and  such that for all ,  if and only if . This result holds for a constant-recursive sequence over the complex numbers, or more generally, over any field of characteristic zero.

Decision problems
The pattern of zeros in a constant-recursive sequence can also be investigated from the perspective of computability theory. To do so, the description of the sequence  must be given a finite description; this can be done if the sequence is over the integers or rational numbers, or even over the algebraic numbers.
Given such an encoding for sequences , the following problems can be studied:

Because the square of a constant-recursive sequence  is still constant-recursive (see closure properties), the existence-of-a-zero problem in the table above reduces to positivity, and infinitely-many-zeros reduces to eventual positivity. Other problems also reduce to those in the above table: for example, whether  for some  reduces to existence-of-a-zero for the sequence .

The Skolem-Mahler-Lech theorem would provide answers to some of these questions, except that its proof is non-constructive. On the other hand, the exact pattern which repeats after  is computable. This is why the infinitely-many-zeros problem is decidable: just determine if the infinitely-repeating pattern is empty.

Decidability results are known when the order of a sequence is restricted to be small. For example, the Skolem problem is decidable for sequences of order up to 4.

Generalizations

 A holonomic sequence is a natural generalization where the coefficients of the recurrence are allowed to be polynomial functions of  rather than constants.
 A -regular sequence satisfies a linear recurrences with constant coefficients, but the recurrences take a different form. Constant-recursive sequences can be thought of as -regular sequences, where the base-1 representation of  consists of  copies of the digit .

Notes

References

Further reading

 

Combinatorics
Dynamical systems
Integer sequences
Linear algebra
Recurrence relations

External links
  OEIS index to a few thousand examples of linear recurrences, sorted by order (number of terms) and signature (vector of values of the constant coefficients)